Rear Admiral Robert Dunham Reilly Jr. (born 1953) was a United States Navy Surface Warfare Flag Officer who retired from active duty in January 2010 after 34-plus years of military service. His last assignment was as the 24th commander of the U.S. Navy's Military Sealift Command (MSC).

Biography
Reilly, a native of Winnetka, Illinois, and a graduate of New Trier High School's West Campus, comes from a family with more than a century of service in the U.S. Military.

He also commanded Cruiser Destroyer Group Two and the  Carrier Strike Group (CSG-10).

Ashore, Reilly served as Operations Readiness Assessment Officer, Commander, U.S. Pacific Fleet staff in Pearl Harbor, Hawaii; Surface Warfare and Weapons Procurement Analyst, Program Resource Appraisal Division (N81), Office of the Chief of Naval Operations; Surface Warfare Junior Officer Assignment Branch Head (PERS 412), Bureau of Naval Personnel; Joint Operations Division Pacific Command Division Chief, Joint Staff (J3); Director, Environmental Readiness, Chief of Naval Operations (CNO N45); and as Deputy Assistant Chief of Naval Operations for Information Technology (CNO N098) and Department of the Navy Deputy Chief Information Officer (Navy).

Reilly assumed command of the Military Sealift Command in March 2006.

Reilly earned a Bachelor of Arts degree in Political Science from the University of Washington, and a Master's in Public Administration (National Resources) from the George Washington University. He is also a 1993 graduate of the Industrial College of the Armed Forces.

Medals and Awards:

Navy Distinguished Service Medal,
Defense Superior Service Medal,
Legion of Merit with three Gold Stars,
Defense Meritorious Service Medal, 
Navy Meritorious Service Medal with two Gold Stars,
Navy and Marine Corps Commendation Medal with one Gold Star,
Navy Unit Commendation,
Meritorious Unit Citation with two Bronze Stars,
Navy "E" Ribbon,
National Defense Service Medal with two Bronze Stars,
Armed Forces Expeditionary Medal,
Southwest Asia Service Medal with one Bronze Star,
Humanitarian Service Medal with two Bronze Stars,
Sea Service Deployment Ribbon with one Silver Star and one Bronze Star,
Navy and Marine Corps Overseas Service Medal,
Republic of Korea Presidential Unit Citation,
Global War on Terror Service Medal,
Armed Forces Service Medal

References

4. Official Transcript of Naval Service for Rear Admiral Robert D. Reilly, Jr. U.S. Navy

External links

1953 births
Living people
Place of birth missing (living people)
People from Winnetka, Illinois
New Trier High School alumni
University of Washington alumni
George Washington University alumni
Recipients of the Legion of Merit
United States Navy admirals
Recipients of the Defense Superior Service Medal